Shamshi-Adad II or Šamši-Adad II, inscribed m(d)Šam-ši-dIM, was an Old Assyrian king who ruled in the mid-second millennium BC,  1585–1580 BC. His reign falls within the "dark age" period of Assyrian history from which written records are scarce.

Biography

There are no extant contemporary sources witnessing his reign. He was the son and successor of Erishum III and ruled for six years (6 MU.MEŠ) according to the Khorsabad and the SDAS copies of the Assyrian Kinglist, where he appears as the 57th name (the Nassouhi Kinglist is poorly preserved in this part). He was succeeded by his son Ishme-Dagan II.

The Synchronistic Kinglist somewhat implausibly gives eight different early Kassite rulers as his contemporaries although only the first five and part of the sixth are legible. These are Agum IGI ašu, Kaštil[...]šu, Abirataš, Kaštilyašu, Tazzigurumaš, and Harba[...]. Brinkman argues that this is a stylistic device and points to the previous reign of Irišum III who is shown as contemporary to Ea-gâmil, the last king of the Sealand Dynasty and Gandaš, the first of the Kassite Dynasty, despite the Chronicle of Early Kings recording that Ea-gâmil fled ahead of the army of Ulam-Buriaš, possibly the 12th Kassite king, at least a hundred years later.

Inscriptions

References

16th-century BC Assyrian kings